Act Your Age is the second album by the rock band Home Grown, released in 1998 by Outpost Recordings. It was the band's only album for a major label. It expanded their popularity and found them moving into a pop punk and pop rock direction musically. The album's most popular tracks were a new version of "Surfer Girl," a song which had originally appeared on their debut album That's Business and "Suffer" which also appeared on Geffen sampler Everything is Beautiful. Act Your Age would be the band's final recording with their original lineup, as guitarist Ian Cone left the band shortly after its release.

The album contains a hidden track called "Too Many Stops" on track 15 after "Reflections." The song plays at 22:59 into the track and is followed by a 1-minute clip of the band members laughing uncontrollably.

Act Your Age was Home Grown's first album to chart; reaching #24 on Billboard's Heatseekers in 1998.

Track listing
"Nowhere Slow" (Lohrbach)
"All That You Have" (Lohrbach)
"She's Anti" (Tran)
"Surfer Girl" (Lohrbach)
"Last Nite Regrets" (Tran)
"Suffer" (Lohrbach)
"Your Past" (Tran)
"Grow Up" (Lohrbach)
"Piss Off" (Tran)
"Let Go" (Lohrbach)
"Bad News Blair" (Tran)
"Kids" (Lohrbach)
"Wow, She Dumb" (Tran)
"Envy Me" (Tran)
"Reflections" (Lohrbach) / "Too Many Stops"

Personnel
John "John E. Trash" Tran – vocals, guitar, moog, keyboard
Ian Cone – guitar, vocals
Adam Lohrbach – vocals, bass, moog, keyboard
Bob Herco – drums

Album information
Recorded at Ocean Way Studios, Sound City Studios, and Louie's Clubhouse
Mixed at Louie's Clubhouse
Produced, engineered, and mixed by Clif Norrell
Assistant engineers: John Sorensen, Greg Fidelman, Victor Janacua
Mastered by Howie Weinberg at Masterdisk in New York
Tracks 1, 2, 4, 6, 8, 10, 12 & 15 written by Adam Lohrbach
Tracks 3, 5, 7, 9, 11, 13 & 14 written by John Tran
Art direction by Pawn Shop Press
Cover photo by Stephen Stickler
Other photography by Alison Dyer

References 

Home Grown albums
1998 albums